The rough-lined elimia, scientific name †Elimia pilsbryi, was a species of freshwater snail with an operculum, an aquatic gastropod mollusk in the family Pleuroceridae. This species was endemic to the United States; it is now extinct.

References 

Elimia
Extinct gastropods
Gastropods described in 1927
Taxa named by Edwin Stephen Goodrich
Taxonomy articles created by Polbot